Delingha Airport  is an airport serving Delingha City, the capital of the Haixi Mongol and Tibetan Autonomous Prefecture in Qinghai Province, China.

Construction began on 27 May 2011, with a total investment of 630 million yuan. The airport was opened on 16 June 2014, with the inaugural flight China Eastern Airlines MU2241 from Xining Caojiabao Airport. Delingha is the fourth civil airport in Qinghai.

Facilities
The airport has a  runway (class 4C), and a  terminal building.  It is projected to handle 200,000 passengers annually by 2020.

Airlines and destinations

See also
List of airports in China
List of the busiest airports in China
List of highest airports

References

Airports in Qinghai
Airports established in 2014
2014 establishments in China
Haixi Mongol and Tibetan Autonomous Prefecture